Talking Books was a Canadian radio program, which aired  on  CBC Radio One. Hosted by Ian Brown, the program was a discussion on books and literature. It was the only books show on CBC Radio that had critical discussions of books, as well as identifying trends, in writing. The program was cancelled in 2008, in order to find a place for  The Next Chapter, hosted by Shelagh Rogers.

External links
 Talking Books website, archived 2012 April 15 by Internet Archive's Wayback Machine

CBC Radio One programs
Canadian talk radio programs